Manuel Feller (born 13 October 1992) is an Austrian World Cup alpine ski racer. Feller specializes in the technical events of slalom and giant slalom, and made his World Cup debut in November 2012.

World Cup results

Season standings

Race podiums
2 wins – (2 SL)
18 podiums - (13 SL, 5 GS); 59 top tens

World Championship results

Olympic results

Junior World Championships
At the World Junior Championships in 2012, Feller finished 27th in the downhill, 14th in the giant slalom, and failed to finish the  The next year in Quebec, Feller won the gold medal in the slalom, ahead of medalists Ramon Zenhaeusern and Santeri Paloniemi, and was ninth in the giant slalom.

References

External links

Austrian Ski team (ÖSV) – official site – Manuel Feller – 
Atomic Skis – Manuel Feller

1992 births
Austrian male alpine skiers
Living people
Alpine skiers at the 2018 Winter Olympics
Alpine skiers at the 2022 Winter Olympics
Olympic alpine skiers of Austria
Medalists at the 2018 Winter Olympics
Olympic medalists in alpine skiing
Olympic silver medalists for Austria